Dilliwaali Zaalim Girlfriend is Hindi romantic comedy film directed by Japinder Kaur and produced by Tarnpreet Singh and Manjeet Kaur under JAP Films. The film features Divyendu Sharma, Jackie Shroff, Prachi Mishra and Ira Dubey in lead roles. The film was released on 20 March 2015.

Plot 
Dhruv (Divyendu Sharma) an aspirant IAS officer, takes a private loan from a company in order to buy a car in order to woo the girl he loves, Sakshi (Prachi Mishra). Soon enough, life turns upside down for him as he is unable to pay back the loan and the car is seized. From then on, begins Dhruv's encounters with today's materialistic girls (where money comes above love), the finance company, the system and a hardened criminal named Minocha (Jackie Shroff).

Cast 
 Divyendu Sharma as Dhruv
 Jackie Shroff as Manocha
 Prachi Mishra as Sakshi
 Ira Dubey as Nimmy
 Pradhuman Singh Mall as Happy
 Natalia Kapchuk – Special appearance in song "Tipsy Hogai"
 Yo Yo Honey Singh – Special appearance in song "Birthday Bash"
 Alfaaz – Special appearance in song "Birthday Bash"
 Jazzy B and Hard Kaur – Special appearance in song "Zalim Dilli"

Critical response
Johnson Thomas of Free Press Journal described the film's setup as promising, but criticised the execution of the story as "imminently predictable and unexciting".

Soundtrack 
The soundtrack for the film is produced by T-Series. This a complete Hip Hop album. There is a special number by Honey Singh titled Birthday Bash and by Dr. Zeus titled Tipsy Hogai. Zaalim Dilli is a song by Jazzy B featuring Hard Kaur.Other album artists include Arijit Singh, Sunidhi Chauhan, Kamal Khan, Agni, Alfaaz, Millind Gaba, and Rajveer Singh

References

External links 
 

Punjabi-language Indian films
Indian romantic comedy films
2010s Hindi-language films
2015 romantic comedy films
2010s Punjabi-language films